Kalamunda is an electoral district of the Legislative Assembly in the Australian state of Western Australia.

Politically, the district is a marginal one. Based on the results of the 2005 state election, the seat was created with a Liberal Party majority of 50.2% to 49.8% versus the Labor Party.

History
Kalamunda was first created for the 1974 election and abolished ahead of the 1989 election. Despite the name, the seat was actually centred on Greenmount in the eastern Hills region, and Kalamunda itself was split between the Kalamunda seat and the neighbouring Darling Range. Despite being within the metropolitan area of Perth, it was regarded as non-metropolitan, and was assigned to the West Province in the Legislative Council. As a result, it had about half the enrolment of the neighbouring seat of Helena. Under the Acts Amendment (Electoral Reform) Act 1987, which reclassified "metropolitan" in the Electoral Act 1907 to include all land within the Metropolitan Region Scheme boundaries and at the same time increased overall metropolitan representation, Kalamunda was merged with Darling Range, and its member, Ian Thompson, won Darling Range on the new boundaries in 1989.

A new seat named Kalamunda was created for the 2008 state election when the number of metropolitan seats was increased in accordance with the new one vote one value legislation. The new district was drawn largely from Darling Range, but also from parts of Kenwick, Midland and Swan Hills.

Geography
Kalamunda is based in the eastern suburbs of Perth. Its boundaries cover two distinct areas. The northern area, centred on Kalamunda, includes Gooseberry Hill, Lesmurdie, Paulls Valley, Piesse Brook and Walliston along with tiny sections of Maida Vale and Forrestfield and all populated portions of Bickley and Carmel. A narrow section extends north to include all of Darlington. In the south, it includes much of Canning Mills, Martin and Orange Grove and the major residential portion of Maddington, excluding its commercial and industrial areas.

The earlier incarnation included the districts of Boya, Darlington, Glen Forrest, Gooseberry Hill, Greenmount, Piesse Brook and Paulls Valley, as well as northern sections of the suburb of Kalamunda including its town centre.

Members for Kalamunda

Election results

References

External links
 

Electoral districts of Western Australia
1974 establishments in Australia
Constituencies established in 1974